Below is a listing of all Super Rugby players that have appeared in 100 or more matches during their career:

Top 10 

The following 10 players are the top appearance makers in Super Rugby.

Other centurions 

The following list is of all remaining Super Rugby centenarians. As no definitive source of number of appearances exist, players are listed in alphabetical order.

Updated following the conclusion of the 2022 Super Rugby Pacific season.
Matches include all finals matches and all matches in Super Rugby Aotearoa, Super Rugby AU, Super Rugby Trans-Tasman and Super Rugby Unlocked.
Players in green were included in 2023 Super Rugby squads.

See also

 Super Rugby
 List of Super Rugby records

Notes

References

Super Rugby
centurions